Spheterista flavocincta is a moth of the family Tortricidae. It was first described by Lord Walsingham in 1907. It is endemic to the Hawaiian islands of Oahu and Hawaii.

It is a highly variable species.

The larvae feed on Santalum species, including S. freycinetianum. They occur on webbed leaves of their host plant. Full-grown larvae are about 8 mm long and pale green.

The pupa is 5 mm long and pale greenish or yellowish. The pupa is formed within the folded-over edge of a leaf. The pupal period lasts about a week.

External links

Archipini
Endemic moths of Hawaii